Gornja Koretica or Korroticë e Gllogocit (in Albanian) is a village in the municipality of Glogovac in central Kosovo. It is a rural settlement of the scattered type, situated at the foothill of Goleš (1018 m), on 610–640 m height, 5km southeast from Glogovac. The cadastral area is 849 hectares. The village population economy is plowing and cattle-raising (24,26% agricultural). A quarry is located in the village.

Notable people
 Haradin Bala (born 1957), a KLA commander convicted for war crimes, was born in the village.

Notes

References 

Villages in Drenas
Quarries in Kosovo
Drenica